Pattaya Tadtong (born 10 May 1979) is a Thai boccia player. He won a bronze medal at the 2004 Summer Paralympics. At the 2012 Summer Paralympics he won gold in the mixed individual BC1 and was on the gold medal-winning Thai team in the mixed team BC1-2. He, along with his 3 teammates, won a gold medal in Boccia in the Mixed Team BC1–2 event.

References

External links
 

1979 births
Living people
Pattaya Tadtong
Pattaya Tadtong
Pattaya Tadtong
Pattaya Tadtong
Paralympic medalists in boccia
Boccia players at the 2004 Summer Paralympics
Boccia players at the 2012 Summer Paralympics
Medalists at the 2004 Summer Paralympics
Medalists at the 2012 Summer Paralympics
Pattaya Tadtong